George Thornewell (8 July 1898 – 6 March 1986) was an English international footballer, who played as an outside right.

Early and personal life
Born in Romiley, Cheshire, Thornewell and his widowed mother moved to Derby when he was eight months old. His father was a railway inspector, and his mother was a cleaner at the railway office. George was the youngest of eight children, one of whom died as an infant. He had a daughter out of wedlock in 1915, and married in 1921. He worked as a fitter at Rolls-Royce and joined the Royal Air Force in July 1918.

Career
He spent his early career with Sunday school teams St. Dunstan's and Normanton United, before playing for the works team of Rolls-Royce in Derby. During World War I he guested for Nottingham Forest and Coventry City, before signing for Derby County in May 1919. He moved to Blackburn Rovers in December 1927, Chesterfield in August 1929, and Newark Town in February 1932.

For Chesterfield he scored 10 goals in 84 Football League games.

He earned four caps for England between 1923 and 1925, scoring on his debut.

Later life and death
In November 1928 he began running The White Hart Hotel in Duffield, living there with his wife and daughter. He died in Derby on 6 March 1986, aged 87.

References

1898 births
1986 deaths
English footballers
England international footballers
Nottingham Forest F.C. wartime guest players
Coventry City F.C. wartime guest players
Derby County F.C. players
Blackburn Rovers F.C. players
Chesterfield F.C. players
Newark Town F.C. players
English Football League players
People from Romiley
Association football outside forwards
FA Cup Final players